Nossa Senhora de Fátima (English: Our Lady of Fátima) was a Portuguese parish (freguesia) in the municipality of Lisbon. It had a total area of 1.87 km2 and total population of 27.111 inhabitants (2001); density: 14,528.9 inhabitants/km2. It was created on February 7, 1959. With the 2012 Administrative Reform, the former Nossa Senhora de Fátima parish merged with the São Sebastião da Pedreira parish into a new parish named Avenidas Novas.

References

Main sites
Campo Pequeno bullring
Nossa Senhora do Rosário de Fátima Church
Museu Calouste Gulbenkian
Galveias Palace

External links
 Nossa Senhora de Fátima's parish website

Former parishes of Lisbon
2012 disestablishments in Portugal